Grenada is a census-designated place (CDP) in Siskiyou County, California, United States.  Its population is 314 as of the 2020 census, down from 367 from the 2010 census. The ZIP code is 96038 and the community is within area code 530.

Geography
Grenada is located at  (41.644438, -122.522768).

Demographics

2010
The 2010 United States Census reported that Grenada had a population of 367. The racial makeup of Grenada was 307 (83.7%) White, 2 (0.5%) African American, 35 (9.5%) Native American, 1 (0.3%) Asian, 0 (0.0%) Pacific Islander, 3 (0.8%) from other races, and 19 (5.2%) from two or more races. Hispanic or Latino of any race were 12 persons (3.3%).

The Census reported that 367 people (100% of the population) lived in households, 0 (0%) lived in non-institutionalized group quarters, and 0 (0%) were institutionalized.

There were 162 households, out of which 40 (24.7%) had children under the age of 18 living in them, 60 (37.0%) were opposite-sex married couples living together, 19 (11.7%) had a female householder with no husband present, 7 (4.3%) had a male householder with no wife present.  There were 9 (5.6%) unmarried opposite-sex partnerships, and 1 (0.6%) same-sex married couples or partnerships. 58 households (35.8%) were made up of individuals, and 36 (22.2%) had someone living alone who was 65 years of age or older. The average household size was 2.27.  There were 86 families (53.1% of all households); the average family size was 3.06.

The population was spread out, with 81 people (22.1%) under the age of 18, 20 people (5.4%) aged 18 to 24, 85 people (23.2%) aged 25 to 44, 86 people (23.4%) aged 45 to 64, and 95 people (25.9%) who were 65 years of age or older.  The median age was 44.5 years. For every 100 females, there were 92.1 males.  For every 100 females age 18 and over, there were 91.9 males.

The homeowner vacancy rate was 2.4%; the rental vacancy rate was 23.4%.  218 people (59.4% of the population) lived in owner-occupied housing units and 149 people (40.6%) lived in rental housing units.

2000
As of the census of 2000, there were 361 people, 139 households, and 93 families residing in the CDP. The population density was 729.3 inhabitants per square mile (282.3/km2). The racial makeup of the CDP was 86.61% White, 0.28% African American, 7.41% Native American, 0.85% Asian, 1.42% from other races, and 3.42% from two or more races. Hispanic or Latino of any race were 3.99% of the population.

There were 139 households, out of which 33.1% had children under the age of 18 living with them, 50.4% were married couples living together, 12.2% had a female householder with no husband present, and 32.4% were non-families. 25.2% of all households were made up of individuals, and 13.7% had someone living alone who was 65 years of age or older.  The average household size was 2.49 and the average family size was 2.99.

In the CDP, the population was spread out, with 27.4% under the age of 18, 5.1% from 18 to 24, 23.4% from 25 to 44, 28.2% from 45 to 64, and 16.0% who were 65 years of age or older.  The median age was 40 years. For every 100 females, there were 99.4 males.  For every 100 females age 18 and over, there were 99.2 males.

The median income for a household in the CDP was $27,813, and the median income for a family was $30,833. Males had a median income of $35,250 versus $20,750 for females. The per capita income for the CDP was $12,601.  About 24.5% of families and 24.4% of the population were below the poverty line, including 48.0% of those under age 18 and 10.6% of those age 65 or over.

Politics

References

External links

Census-designated places in Siskiyou County, California
Census-designated places in California